Bârlad Plateau is a geographic area in eastern Romania. It is the south central part of the Moldavian Plateau.

The river Bârlad and its tributaries have cut in it the northern part of the Bârlad plateau, which sometimes is called Podișul Central Moldovenesc, a term that can be easily confused with the reserved term Podișul Moldovei Centrale (in English both translate as the Central Moldavian Plateau). The northernmost hill formation (edge) is called the Iași Ridge. Other parts of the Bârlad Plateau:

 Tutova Hills, 
 Fălciu Hills, 
 Covurlui Plateau, and 
 Elanului Depression.

Plateaus of Romania